Shams-ud-Din Shah Mir was a ruler of Kashmir and founder of the Shah Mir dynasty. Shah Mir is believed to have come to Kashmir during the rule of Suhadeva, where he rose to prominence. After the death of Suhadeva and his brother, Udayanadeva, Shah Mir proposed marriage to the reigning queen, Kota Rani. She refused and continued her rule for five months till 1339, appointing Bhutta Bhikshana as prime minister. After the death of Kota Rani, Shah Mir established his own kingship, founding the Shah Mir dynasty in 1339, which lasted till 1561.

Origin

There are two theories regarding Shah Mir's origin. Some Persian chronicles of Kashmir describe Shah Mir as a descendant of the rulers of Swat. Historian A. Q. Rafiqi thinks it more likely that he was a descendant of Persian or Turkic immigrants to Swat. It has also been suggested that he belonged to a Sufi or Qadiri family. Some scholars state that the Panjgabbar valley, the location described by Jonaraja,  was actually peopled by Khasas and so ascribe a Khasa ethnicity to Shah Mir.
Most modern historians accept the Swati origins of Shah Mir. Kashmiri scholar N. K. Zutshi, having critically examined the sources, reconciles the two versions by noting that the Persian chronicles mentions Swadgir rather than Swat, which he interprets as Swadgabar, meaning "suburbs of Gabar", which coincides with Jonaraja's description of Panchagahvara-Simani (on the borders of Panchagagvara).

A. Q. Rafiqi states:

Career

Early Service 
During the reign of Suhadeva, a Tatar chief by the name of Zulju invaded Kashmir and ravaged it. Suhadeva fled the country and his general Ramachandra occupied the throne. In the confusion Rinchan, sought the aid of various generals, including Shah Mir, and caused an internal uprising, seizing the throne. He married Kota Rani, the daughter of Ramachandra. Rinchan embraced Islam at the hands of the ascetic, Bulbul Shah, and took the Muslim name of Sultan Sadruddin. He was later attacked by rebels, and was badly wounded, dying in 1323 A.D. 

Just before his death Sultan Sadruddin summoned his trusted minister, Shah Mir, who had since then risen to some prominence, and put his son, Haider, and wife, Kota Rani, in his care. After the death of Sadruddin, Kota Rani married Udayanadeva, the brother of Suhadeva. However he was a weak ruler, so nearly all duties associated with governance fell on Kota Rani.

During and After the Later Turco-Mongol Invasion 
During the reign of Udayanadeva, the Kashmir Valley was again invaded by Mongol-Turk forces, and Udayanadeva fled to Ladakh. Kota Rani, along with Shah Mir, called upon the many disorganized Damara (warlords of Kashmir), rallying them together. This now unified resistance defeated the invading armies, prompting their retreat from the valley.

Revolt Against Kota Rani 
In the aftermath of the conflict, Shah Mir won prestige for his role in unifying the people. Kota Rani took notice of his increasing popularity, and in an effort to check him, appointed Bhatta Bhiksana, a powerful man within the kingdom, as her Prime Minister. She also decided to move her capital to Andarkot, away from Srinagar, where Shah Mir had a great influence. This enraged Shah Mir, as he felt ignored in spite of his great labors for the kingdom. He had  Bhiksana assassinated , and asked Kota Rani to marry him and share power, threatening to wage war on her if she was to refuse. She declined, and the two of them began organizing their armies.

Shah Mir set out with his army from Srinagar towards Andarkot. Kota Rani sent out a force to check his advance, but it was promptly defeated. The fort at Andarkot was then laid siege to. While this was going on, many of Kota Rani's troops, seeing the futility of the situation, deserted and joined Shah Mir, to whom most important chiefs in the kingdom had already pledged allegiance.

Kota Rani soon surrendered, and accepted Shah Mir's earlier proposal. However given the awkward situation in which Kota Rani accepted, and the possibility for a counter-uprising, made more probable when accounting for the small slivers of support Kota Ranis till had, Shah Mir could not take any risks. Kota Rani and her two sons were imprisoned, where they later died.

Aftermath and Establishment of the Sultanate 
With Kota Rani defeated, Shar Mir declared himself ruler, taking on the title Sultan Shams-ud-Din. 

Shams-ud-Din worked to establish Islam in Kashmir and was aided by his descendants. In an effort to keep the local feudal chiefs in check, he raised to power two indigenous families, the Magres and the Chaks. He also introduced a new era to the people of Kashmir, called the Kashmiri Era. This replaced the Laukika Era that had existed prior to this. The Kashmiri Era began with Rinchan's accession and conversion to Islam in 720 A.H. (~1320 CE) This Era remained in use until the Mughal Conquest of Kashmir in 1586. Shams-ud-Din had two sons, Jamshed and Ali Sher. 

He reigned for three years and five months from 1339–42. He is currently buried in Andarkot, near Sambal.

Succession 
Sultan Shah Mir died in 1342. He was buried in Andarkot, near Sambal. He was succeeded by Sultan Jamshed as the second sultan of ShahMiri Sultanate.

See also
Shah Miri dynasty
Sikandar Butshikan
Mir Sayyid Ali Hamadani

Notes

References

Bibliography

External links
 Baharistan-i-Shahi: A Chronicle of Mediaeval Kashmir

Sultans of Kashmir
14th-century Indian Muslims